Elizabeth Wells Cannon (December 7, 1859 – September 2, 1942), also referred to as Annie Wells Cannon, was a prominent women's suffragist in Utah who served in the Utah House of Representatives from 1913 to 1915 and again in 1921. She was also president of the Daughters of Utah Pioneers and a charter member of the Utah Red Cross.

Early life
Elizabeth Ann "Annie" Wells was born in Salt Lake City, Utah, on December 7, 1859, the daughter of General Daniel Hammer Wells (1814-1891) and Emmeline Blanche Woodward (1828-1921). She had 29 siblings.

She attended the Deseret University.

Career
Elizabeth Wells Cannon worked for fifteen years as a reporter and assistant editor for the Woman's Exponent, a Utah Suffrage paper published and edited by her mother Emmeline B. Wells, and she contributed verse and prose to various magazines and newspapers. 

She was a member of House of Representatives, an author of measures for social welfare and art. 

She was the director of the Library Board. 

She was a member of the Board of Directors of the American Relief Association, national historian and twice state president of the Service Star Legion, and honorary member for Utah for the National Woman's Relief Society. In 1883 she wrote The History and Objectives of the Relief Society and co-authored the Relief Society Handbook. She was chosen by Herbert Hoover to be Utah's chairman for the European Relief Drive.

In 1918 she was associate vice-president of the American Flag Association.

She was a member of the Daughters of Utah Pioneers, the American Woman's Association, the Utah Woman's Press Club, the Order of Bookfellows.

Personal life
In 1879 Elizabeth Wells married Col. John Quayle Cannon (1857-1931). They lived in Salt Lake City, Utah, finally settling at 1354 South 9th West; and had twelve children, eleven of whom lived to adulthood, and three of whom served in World War I:
 George Quayle Cannon (1881-1967)
 Louise Blanche Cannon (Andrew) (1884-1967)
 Margaret Cannon (Clayton) (1886-1977)
 Daniel Hoagland Cannon (1889-1954)
 Eleanor Addy Cannon (1891-1892)
 Emmeline Cannon (Martineau) (1893-1972)
 Cavendish Wells Cannon (1895-1962)
 Katherine Cannon (McKay) (1897-1947)
 David Woodward Cannon (1899-1973)
 Abraham Hoagland Cannon (1899-1992)
 John Quayle Cannon (1901-1980)
 Theodore Lincoln Cannon (1904-1966)

Elizabeth died in Salt Lake City, of Hodgkin's lymphoma, and is buried at Salt Lake City Cemetery.

Publications

References

External links 
 The Annie Wells Cannon Papers at the University of Utah
Annie Wells Cannon journals, Brigham Young University, Harold B. Lee Library, L. Tom Perry Special Collections
Emmeline B. Wells and Annie Wells Cannon papers, Brigham Young University, Harold B. Lee Library, L. Tom Perry Special Collections

1859 births
1942 deaths
Latter Day Saints from Utah
American suffragists
Deaths from cancer in Utah
Cannon family
American newspaper journalists
American women journalists
Deaths from Hodgkin lymphoma
Members of the Utah House of Representatives
People of Utah Territory
Presidents of Daughters of Utah Pioneers
Women state legislators in Utah
People from Salt Lake City
19th-century American women politicians
19th-century American politicians
20th-century American women politicians
20th-century American politicians